Lavington Square Shopping Centre opened in 1979 in the Albury suburb of Lavington, New South Wales, Australia.  Since opening the shopping centre has undergone several upgrades and name changes the most major upgrades to the centre were done after Centro bought the shopping centre in 1994.  The shopping centre currently has 57 specialty retailers and 3 major retailers including Woolworths, and Big W. The shopping centre also houses the lavington Australia Post branch for the post code of 2641.  In 2013, the centre's revenue was $116 million.

History
The centre opened in July 1979 under the name "Border Shoppingtown".  It was built by developers RDC Properties and T&G Mutual Life Society on the site of former orchard.  It was also known as "Centro Lavington" for some time, but then returned to the "Lavington Square" name in 2013.

 1996 saw the shopping centre gain extensions including a fresh food area.
 In 2004-06, when known as "Centro Lavington", the shopping centre went under a major redevelopment with work beginning July 2004 and adding a 350-seat Diners Life food court, a Fresh Life precinct and 20 new specialty stores including Best & Less, The Reject Shop and a refurbishment of Big W. local construction group Zauner acquired the 22 million contract to build and construct the shopping centre. The centre was officially opened on 16 March 2006 at a cost of 33 million.

Anchor tenants
 Woolworths (Formerly Safeway)
 Big W

See also
 List of shopping centres in Australia

References

Shopping centres in New South Wales
Albury, New South Wales